Sagarikaya Dam is a gravity dam located in Tottori prefecture in Japan. The dam is used for irrigation and recreation. The catchment area of the dam is 13 km2. The dam impounds about 24 ha of land when full and can store 3860 thousand cubic meters of water. The construction of the dam was completed in 2001.

References

Dams in Tottori Prefecture
2001 establishments in Japan